Kristian Fahlstrøm (c. 1917 – 27 December 2005) was a Norwegian newspaper editor.

During the occupation of Norway by Nazi Germany he was an active resistance member; he was awarded the Defence Medal 1940 – 1945. He worked in Møre Dagblad from 1950 to 1953 and Adresseavisen from 1954 to 1959. He was then the editor-in-chief of Farsunds Avis from 1959 to 1983, except for the years 1964 to 1968, when he worked briefly as director of tourism in Kristiansand and as the editor-in-chief of Gjengangeren. He was also active in Rotary. He has published several books about local history.

References

1910s births
2005 deaths
Year of birth uncertain
Norwegian newspaper editors
Norwegian resistance members